Ravinder Goswami (born 3 September 1963) is an Indian endocrinologist and professor at the department of endocrinology and metabolism at the All India Institute of Medical Sciences, Delhi. Known for his research on vitamin D deficiency, Goswami is an elected fellow of National Academy of Sciences, India and Indian Academy of Sciences. The Council of Scientific and Industrial Research, the apex agency of the Government of India for scientific research, awarded him the Shanti Swarup Bhatnagar Prize for Science and Technology, one of the highest Indian science awards for his contributions to Medical Sciences in 2008.

Biography 

Ravinder Goswami, after earning his bachelor's degree in medicine from Maulana Azad Medical College, continued at the institution to complete his MD and secured a DM in endocrinology from the All India Institute of Medical Sciences, Delhi. He did his post-doctoral work by joining AIIMS in 1992, working under Narayana Panicker Kochupillai and has since been associated with the institution. In between, he had two sabbaticals; first at the University of Newcastle under Patricia Crock and later, at Harvard Medical School at the laboratory of Edward M. Brown. At AIIMS, he served as the sub-dean of research during 2011–13 and is a professor at the department of endocrinology and metabolism.

Goswami lives in East AIIMS campus, in New Delhi.

Legacy 
Goswami's studies have been focusing focused on clinical endocrinology and he has carried out research on diseases such as hypocalcemia and idiopathic hypoparathyroidism. His studies on vitamin D deficiency covered etiopathogenesis and gravity of the disorder across the population and his work was the first of its kind in India. His research revealed that vitamin D deficiency among Indian population is due to their dark skin (which prevented formation of vitamin D by blocking ultra violet rays) as well as inhibition of over-expression of Calcitriol receptor gene, resulting in inadequate bio-adaptation. He advocated against treating the nutritional deficiency through supplements and advised exposure to sunlight as a remedial measure. His work on idiopathic hypoparathyroidism assisted in widening the understanding of the disease with regard to its clinical signs such as parathyroid spondyloarthropathy, basal ganglia calcification and development of hyperphosphatemia. His studies have been documented by way of a number of articles of which many have been listed by online article repositories such as Google Scholar and ResearchGate. Besides, he has contributed chapters to books published by others and his work has drawn citations from other authors. He has also presented his research at medical forums including the National Symposium on Nutrition and Bone Health of Nutrition Foundation of India held in 2007. and serves as an editorial associate for the Annals of the National Academy of Medical Sciences (India).

Awards and honors 
The Council of Scientific and Industrial Research awarded Goswami the Shanti Swarup Bhatnagar Prize, one of the highest Indian science awards in 2008. The Indian Academy of Sciences elected him as a fellow the same year and he became an elected fellow of the National Academy of Sciences, India in 2010.

Selected bibliography

See also 

 Diabetes mellitus type 1
 Cushing's disease
 Fahr's syndrome
 Coeliac disease

Notes

References

External links

Further reading 
 

1963 births
Medical doctors from Delhi
Indian endocrinologists
Indian medical writers
Maulana Azad College alumni
All India Institute of Medical Sciences, New Delhi alumni
Academic staff of the All India Institute of Medical Sciences, New Delhi
University of Newcastle (Australia) alumni
Harvard Medical School alumni
Recipients of the Shanti Swarup Bhatnagar Award in Medical Science
Fellows of The National Academy of Sciences, India
Fellows of the Indian Academy of Sciences
20th-century Indian medical doctors
Living people